Hard Volume is the second album by the Rollins Band, released in 1989. It was reissued with previously unreleased tracks in 1999.

The original CD release contained a 32-minute jam on the Velvet Underground outtake "Move Right In," titled "Joy Riding with Frank." The track was recorded live in Linz, Austria, during the band's 1988 tour. The 1999 remastered edition replaced this track with six studio tracks: three from the album session at Echo Sound in Los Angeles on December 1988, and three from a demo session recorded in July 1988 at Graphic Studios in New Jersey.

Critical reception
Trouser Press wrote that Rollins "sinks into an existential funk on the seven-song Hard Volume ... Oddly, the rest of the band seems unaffected by his moods, and the music — a well-organized rock juggernaut — thunders along happily." Dave Thompson, in Alternative Rock, called the album "a funked-up swagger that is moody and electrically eclectic."

Track listing
All tracks composed by the Rollins Band, except where indicated.

Original release
"Hard" – 4:06
"What Have I Got" – 4:58
"I Feel Like This" – 4:26
"Planet Joe" – 4:18
"Love Song" – 6:22
"Turned Inside Out" – 6:24
"Down and Away" – 8:20
"Joy Riding with Frank" - 32:04

Remastered version (1999)
"Hard" – 4:06
"What Have I Got" – 4:58
"I Feel Like This" – 4:26
"Planet Joe" – 4:18
"Love Song" – 6:22
"Turned Inside Out" – 6:24
"Down and Away" – 8:20

Session outtakes
"Tearing" – 4:58*
"You Didn't Need" – 5:11*
"Ghost Rider" (Martin Rev, Alan Vega) – 7:23*

Demo: July 1988
"What Have I Got" – 4:33*
"Thin Air" – 8:21*
"Down and Away" – 7:14*

Personnel
Rollins Band
Henry Rollins – vocals
Chris Haskett – guitar
Andrew Weiss – bass guitar
Sim Cain – percussion, drums

Others
Theo Van Rock – producer, mixing
Rae DiLeo – mixing
George Marino – mastering (1999 remaster)
Wally Traugott – mastering (1989 original)
Jeff Aguila – design

References

Rollins Band albums
1989 albums
Buddah Records albums